The following is a complete list of compositions of classical composer Luigi Boccherini. Boccherini's works were catalogued by the French musicologist Yves Gérard (1932–2020) in the Gérard catalog, published in London (1969), hence the "G" numbers for his output.

Cello Sonatas
G 1: Cello Sonata in F major
G 2a: Cello Sonata in C minor
G 2b: Cello Sonata in C minor
G 3: Cello Sonata in C major
G 4a: Cello Sonata in A major
G 4b: Cello Sonata in A major
G 5: Cello Sonata in G major
G 6: Cello Sonata in C major
G 7: Cello Sonata in C major
G 8: Cello Sonata in B-flat major
G 9: Cello Sonata in F major
G 10: Cello Sonata in E-flat major
G 11: Cello Sonata in E-flat major
G 12: Cello Sonata in B-flat major
G 13: Cello Sonata in A major
G 14: Cello Sonata in E-flat major
G 15: Cello Sonata in G major
G 16: Cello Sonata in E-flat major
G 17: Cello Sonata in C major
G 18: Cello Sonata in C minor (may also be for viola)
G 19: Cello Sonata in F major
G 562: Cello Sonata in G minor
G 563: Cello Sonata in G major
G 564: Cello Sonata in D major
G 565a: Cello Sonata in B-flat major
G 565b: Cello Sonata in B-flat major
G 566: Cello Sonata in E-flat major
G 567: Cello Sonata in E-flat major
G 568: Cello Sonata in E-flat major
G 569: Cello Sonata in C major
G 579: Cello Sonata in F major
G 580: Cello Sonata in D major
G deest: Cello Sonata in A major
G deest: Cello Sonata in A minor
G deest: Cello Sonata in C minor
G deest: Cello Sonata in C minor
G deest: Cello Sonata in D major
G deest: Cello Sonata in E-flat major
G deest: Cello Sonata in F minor

Works for Keyboard
G 21: Sinfonia for keyboard in E-flat major (doubtful)
G 22: Keyboard Sonata in E-flat major (from G30)
G 23: 6 Keyboard Sonatas from Trios G 143–148
G 24: 6 Keyboard Sonatas from Trios G 95–100

Violin Sonatas
G 20: 6 Violin Sonatas from cello sonatas
G 25: Violin Sonata Op. 5 No. 1 in B-flat major
G 26: Violin Sonata Op. 5 No. 2 in C major
G 27: Violin Sonata Op. 5 No. 3 in B-flat major
G 28: Violin Sonata Op. 5 No. 4 in D major
G 29: Violin Sonata Op. 5 No. 5 in G minor
G 30: Violin Sonata Op. 5 No. 6 in E-flat major
G 31: 6 Violin Sonatas (lost)
G 32: 3 Violin Sonatas, Book 3 (lost)
G 33: 3 Violin Sonatas, Book 4 (lost)
G 34: Violin Sonata Op. 13 No. 1 in C major
G 35: Violin Sonata Op. 13 No. 2 in E major
G 36: Violin Sonata Op. 13 No. 3 in B-flat major
G 37: Violin Sonata Op. 13 No. 4 in E-flat major
G 38: Violin Sonata Op. 13 No. 5 in A major
G 39: Violin Sonata Op. 13 No. 6 in D major
G 40: Violin Sonata "Naderman" No. 1 in C major
G 41: Violin Sonata "Naderman" No. 2 in B-flat major
G 42: Violin Sonata "Naderman" No. 3 in D minor
G 43: Violin Sonata "Naderman" No. 4 in C minor
G 44: Violin Sonata "Naderman" No. 5 in B-flat major
G 45: Violin Sonata "Naderman" No. 6 in C minor
G 46: Violin Sonata Op. 33 No. 1 in C minor
G 47: Violin Sonata Op. 33 No. 2 in D major
G 48: Violin Sonata Op. 33 No. 3 in B-flat major
G 49: Violin Sonata Op. 33 No. 4 in A major
G 50: Violin Sonata Op. 33 No. 5 in E-flat major
G 51: Violin Sonata Op. 33 No. 6 in E major
G 52: Violin Sonata "Robinson" No. 1 in B-flat major
G 53: Violin Sonata "Robinson" No. 2 in E-flat major
G 54: Violin Sonata "Robinson" No. 3 in E major
G 55: Rondo for violin & harpsichord in G major
G 570: Violin Sonata in E-flat major

Duets for Violins
G 56: Violin Duet Op. 3 No. 1 in G major (1761)
G 57: Violin Duet Op. 3 No. 2 in F major
G 58: Violin Duet Op. 3 No. 3 in A major
G 59: Violin Duet Op. 3 No. 4 in B-flat major
G 60: Violin Duet Op. 3 No. 5 in E-flat major
G 61: Violin Duet Op. 3 No. 6 in D major
G 62: Violin Duet in E-flat major (c. 1766)
G 63: Violin Duet Op. 46 No. 1 in G major (1797)
G 64: Violin Duet Op. 46 No. 2 in E major
G 65: Violin Duet Op. 46 No. 3 in F minor
G 66: Violin Duet Op. 46 No. 4 in C major
G 67: Violin Duet Op. 46 No. 5 in E-flat major
G 68: Violin Duet Op. 46 No. 6 in D minor
G 69: Violin Duet in C major
G 70: Violin Duet in C major
G 71: Violin Duet in D major
G 72: 6 Violin Duets

Duets for Cellos
G 73: 6 Fugues for 2 cellos
G 74: Sonata for 2 cellos in C major
G 75: Sonata for 2 cellos in E-flat major
G 76: 6 Duets from Quartets Op. 26, G 195–200
G 571: Sonata for 2 cellos in D major
G 572: Sonata for 2 cellos in D major

String Trios
G 77: String Trio Op. 1 No. 1 in F major (1760)
G 78: String Trio Op. 1 No. 2 in B-flat major
G 79: String Trio Op. 1 No. 3 in A major
G 80: String Trio Op. 1 No. 4 in D major
G 81: String Trio Op. 1 No. 5 in G major
G 82: String Trio Op. 1 No. 6 in C major
G 83: String Trio Op. 4 No. 1 in E-flat major (1766)
G 84: String Trio Op. 4 No. 2 in B-flat major
G 85: String Trio Op. 4 No. 3 in E major
G 86: String Trio Op. 4 No. 4 in F minor
G 87: String Trio Op. 4 No. 5 in D major
G 88: String Trio Op. 4 No. 6 in F major
G 89: String Trio Op. 6 No. 1 in B-flat major (1769)
G 90: String Trio Op. 6 No. 2 in E-flat major
G 91: String Trio Op. 6 No. 3 in A major
G 92: String Trio Op. 6 No. 4 in F major
G 93: String Trio Op. 6 No. 5 in G minor
G 94: String Trio Op. 6 No. 6 in C major
G 95: String Trio Op. 14 No. 1 in F major (1772)
G 96: String Trio Op. 14 No. 2 in C minor
G 97: String Trio Op. 14 No. 3 in A major
G 98: String Trio Op. 14 No. 4 in D major
G 99: String Trio Op. 14 No. 5 in E-flat major
G 100: String Trio Op. 14 No. 6 in F major
G 101: String Trio Op. 34 No. 1 in F minor (1781)
G 102: String Trio Op. 34 No. 2 in G major
G 103: String Trio Op. 34 No. 3 in E-flat major
G 104: String Trio Op. 34 No. 4 in D major
G 105: String Trio Op. 34 No. 5 in C major
G 106: String Trio Op. 34 No. 6 in E major
G 107: String Trio Op. 47 No. 1 in A-flat major (1793) [Op.47 in Boccherini's autograph catalogue, published as Op.38]
G 108: String Trio Op. 47 No. 2 in G major
G 109: String Trio Op. 47 No. 3 in B-flat major
G 110: String Trio Op. 47 No. 4 in E-flat major
G 111: String Trio Op. 47 No. 5 in D major
G 112: String Trio Op. 47 No. 6 in F major
G 113: String Trio Op. 54 No. 1 in D major (1796)
G 114: String Trio Op. 54 No. 2 in G major
G 115: String Trio Op. 54 No. 3 in E-flat major
G 116: String Trio Op. 54 No. 4 in C major
G 117: String Trio Op. 54 No. 5 in D minor
G 118: String Trio Op. 54 No. 6 in A major
G 119: String Trio Op. 3 No. 1 in C major (doubtful)
G 120: String Trio Op. 3 No. 2 in A major
G 121: String Trio Op. 3 No. 3 in A major
G 122: String Trio Op. 3 No. 4 in D major
G 123: String Trio Op. 3 No. 5 in D major
G 124: String Trio Op. 3 No. 6 in E-flat major
G 125: String Trio Op. 7 No. 1 in C minor (spurious, attributed to Luigi Marescalchi)
G 126: String Trio Op. 7 No. 2 in D major
G 127: String Trio Op. 7 No. 3 in E-flat major
G 128: String Trio Op. 7 No. 4 in A major
G 129: String Trio Op. 7 No. 5 in B-flat major
G 130: String Trio Op. 7 No. 6 in F major
G 131: String Trio Op. 28 No. 1 in D major (spurious, attributed to Giuseppe Cambini)
G 132: String Trio Op. 28 No. 2 in E-flat major
G 133: String Trio Op. 28 No. 3 in C minor
G 134: String Trio Op. 28 No. 4 in A major
G 135: String Trio Op. 28 No. 5 in B-flat major
G 136: String Trio Op. 28 No. 6 in G major
G 137: String Trio in B-flat major
G 138: String Trio in F major
G 139: String Trio in G major
G 140: String Trio in E-flat major
G 141: String Trio in A major
G 142: String Trio in C major
G 577: String Trio in G major
G 578: String Trio in G major

Piano Trios
G 143: Piano Trio Op. 12 No. 1 in C major (c. 1780, doubtful)
G 144: Piano Trio Op. 12 No. 2 in E minor
G 145: Piano Trio Op. 12 No. 3 in E-flat major
G 146: Piano Trio Op. 12 No. 4 in D major
G 147: Piano Trio Op. 12 No. 5 in B-flat major
G 148: Piano Trio Op. 12 No. 6 in G minor
G 149: 3 Piano Trios. Oeuvre I
G 150: Piano Trio in D minor
G 151: Piano Trio in B-flat major
G 152: Piano Trio in D minor
G 153: Piano Trio in G minor
G 154: 3 Piano Trios. Oeuvre II

Trio Sonatas with Flute(s)
G 155: 3 Flute Trios, Book I (lost)
G 156: 3 Flute Trios, Book II (lost)
G 157: Trio for 2 flutes & continuo in C major
G 158: Trio for 2 flutes & continuo in D major

String Quartets
G 159: String Quartet Op. 2 No. 1 in C minor (1761)
G 160: String Quartet Op. 2 No. 2 in B-flat major
G 161: String Quartet Op. 2 No. 3 in D major
G 162: String Quartet Op. 2 No. 4 in E-flat major
G 163: String Quartet Op. 2 No. 5 in E major
G 164: String Quartet Op. 2 No. 6 in C major
G 165: String Quartet Op. 8 No. 1 in D major (c. 1768)
G 166: String Quartet Op. 8 No. 2 in C minor
G 167: String Quartet Op. 8 No. 3 in E-flat major
G 168: String Quartet Op. 8 No. 4 in G minor
G 169: String Quartet Op. 8 No. 5 in F major
G 170: String Quartet Op. 8 No. 6 in A major
G 171: String Quartet Op. 9 No. 1 in C minor (1770)
G 172: String Quartet Op. 9 No. 2 in D minor
G 173: String Quartet Op. 9 No. 3 in F major
G 174: String Quartet Op. 9 No. 4 in E-flat major
G 175: String Quartet Op. 9 No. 5 in D major
G 176: String Quartet Op. 9 No. 6 in E major
G 177: String Quartet Op. 15 No. 1 in D major (1772)
G 178: String Quartet Op. 15 No. 2 in F major
G 179: String Quartet Op. 15 No. 3 in E major
G 180: String Quartet Op. 15 No. 4 in F major
G 181: String Quartet Op. 15 No. 5 in E-flat major
G 182: String Quartet Op. 15 No. 6 in C minor
G 183: String Quartet Op. 22 No. 1 in C major (1775)
G 184: String Quartet Op. 22 No. 2 in D major
G 185: String Quartet Op. 22 No. 3 in E-flat major
G 186: String Quartet Op. 22 No. 4 in B-flat major
G 187: String Quartet Op. 22 No. 5 in A minor
G 188: String Quartet Op. 22 No. 6 in C major
G 189: String Quartet Op. 24 No. 1 in D major (1776-8)
G 190: String Quartet Op. 24 No. 2 in A major
G 191: String Quartet Op. 24 No. 3 in E-flat major
G 192: String Quartet Op. 24 No. 4 in C major
G 193: String Quartet Op. 24 No. 5 in C minor
G 194: String Quartet Op. 24 No. 6 in G minor
G 195: String Quartet Op. 26 No. 1 in B-flat major (1778)
G 196: String Quartet Op. 26 No. 2 in G minor
G 197: String Quartet Op. 26 No. 3 in E-flat major
G 198: String Quartet Op. 26 No. 4 in A major
G 199: String Quartet Op. 26 No. 5 in F major
G 200: String Quartet Op. 26 No. 6 in F minor
G 201: String Quartet Op. 32 No. 1 in E-flat major (1780)
G 202: String Quartet Op. 32 No. 2 in E minor
G 203: String Quartet Op. 32 No. 3 in D major
G 204: String Quartet Op. 32 No. 4 in C major
G 205: String Quartet Op. 32 No. 5 in G minor
G 206: String Quartet Op. 32 No. 6 in A major
G 207: String Quartet Op. 33 No. 1 in E major (1781)
G 208: String Quartet Op. 33 No. 2 in C major
G 209: String Quartet Op. 33 No. 3 in G major
G 210: String Quartet Op. 33 No. 4 in B-flat major
G 211: String Quartet Op. 33 No. 5 in E minor
G 212: String Quartet Op. 33 No. 6 in E-flat major
G 213: String Quartet Op. 39 in A major (1787)
G 214: String Quartet Op. 41 No. 1 in C minor (1788)
G 215: String Quartet Op. 41 No. 2 in C major
G 216: String Quartet Op. 42 No. 1 in A major (1789)
G 217: String Quartet Op. 42 No. 2 in C major
G 218: String Quartet Op. 43 No. 1 in A major (1790)
G 219: String Quartet Op. 43 No. 2 in A major
G 220: String Quartet Op. 44 No. 1 in B-flat major (1792)
G 221: String Quartet Op. 44 No. 2 in E minor
G 222: String Quartet Op. 44 No. 3 in F major
G 223: String Quartet Op. 44 No. 4 in G major ("La tiranna")
G 224: String Quartet Op. 44 No. 5 in D major
G 225: String Quartet Op. 44 No. 6 in E-flat major
G 226: String Quartet Op. 48 No. 1 in F major (1794)
G 227: String Quartet Op. 48 No. 2 in A major
G 228: String Quartet Op. 48 No. 3 in B minor
G 229: String Quartet Op. 48 No. 4 in E-flat major
G 230: String Quartet Op. 48 No. 5 in G major
G 231: String Quartet Op. 48 No. 6 in C major
G 232: String Quartet Op. 52 No. 1 in C major (1795)
G 233: String Quartet Op. 52 No. 2 in D major
G 234: String Quartet Op. 52 No. 3 in G major
G 235: String Quartet Op. 52 No. 4 in F minor
G 236: String Quartet Op. 53 No. 1 in E-flat major (1796)
G 237: String Quartet Op. 53 No. 2 in D major
G 238: String Quartet Op. 53 No. 3 in C major
G 239: String Quartet Op. 53 No. 4 in A major
G 240: String Quartet Op. 53 No. 5 in C major
G 241: String Quartet Op. 53 No. 6 in E-flat major
G 242: String Quartet Op. 58 No. 1 in C major (1799)
G 243: String Quartet Op. 58 No. 2 in E-flat major
G 244: String Quartet Op. 58 No. 3 in B-flat major
G 245: String Quartet Op. 58 No. 4 in B minor
G 246: String Quartet Op. 58 No. 5 in D major
G 247: String Quartet Op. 58 No. 6 in E-flat major
G 248: String Quartet Op. 64 No. 1 in F major (1804)
G 249: String Quartet Op. 64 No. 2 in D major
G 250: String Quartet Op. 54 No. 1 in D major (1796, doubtful)
G 251: String Quartet Op. 54 No. 2 in G major
G 252: String Quartet Op. 54 No. 3 in C major
G 253: String Quartet Op. 54 No. 4 in A major
G 254: String Quartet Op. 54 No. 5 in C major
G 255: String Quartet Op. 54 No. 6 in D major
G 256: 6 String Quartets from Op. 10, G 265–270 (doubtful)
G 257: 2 String Quartets from G 287 & 290
G 258: String Quartet in F minor (lost)

Piano Quartets
G 259: 6 Piano Quartets from Quartets Op. 26, G 195–200

Flute Quartets
G 260: 3 Flute Quartets Op. 5 from G 369, 363 & 368
G 261: 6 Flute Quartets (arrangements lost)

Wind Quartets
G 262: Wind Quartets No. 1–3
G 263: Wind Quartets No. 4–6
G 264: Wind Quartets No. 7–9

String Quintets
G 265: String Quintet Op. 10 No. 1 in A major (1771)
G 266: String Quintet Op. 10 No. 2 in E-flat major
G 267: String Quintet Op. 10 No. 3 in C minor
G 268: String Quintet Op. 10 No. 4 in C major

G 269: String Quintet Op. 10 No. 5 in E-flat major
G 270: String Quintet Op. 10 No. 6 in D major

G 271: String Quintet Op. 11 No. 1 in B-flat major (1771)

G 272: String Quintet Op. 11 No. 2 in A major

G 273: String Quintet Op. 11 No. 3 in C major
G 274: String Quintet Op. 11 No. 4 in F minor
G 275: String Quintet Op. 11 No. 5 in E major (featured in The Ladykillers)
G 276: String Quintet Op. 11 No. 6 in D major

G 277: String Quintet Op. 13 No. 1 in E-flat major (1772)
G 278: String Quintet Op. 13 No. 2 in C major
G 279: String Quintet Op. 13 No. 3 in F major
G 280: String Quintet Op. 13 No. 4 in D minor
G 281: String Quintet Op. 13 No. 5 in A major
G 282: String Quintet Op. 13 No. 6 in E major

G 283: String Quintet Op. 18 No. 1 in C minor (1774)
G 284: String Quintet Op. 18 No. 2 in D major
G 285: String Quintet Op. 18 No. 3 in E-flat major
G 286: String Quintet Op. 18 No. 4 in C major
G 287: String Quintet Op. 18 No. 5 in D minor
G 288: String Quintet Op. 18 No. 6 in E major
G 289: String Quintet Op. 20 No. 1 in E-flat major (1775)
G 290: String Quintet Op. 20 No. 2 in B-flat major
G 291: String Quintet Op. 20 No. 3 in F major
G 292: String Quintet Op. 20 No. 4 in G major
G 293: String Quintet Op. 20 No. 5 in D minor
G 294: String Quintet Op. 20 No. 6 in A minor
G 295: String Quintet Op. 25 No. 1 in D minor (1778)
G 296: String Quintet Op. 25 No. 2 in E-flat major
G 297: String Quintet Op. 25 No. 3 in A major
G 298: String Quintet Op. 25 No. 4 in C major
G 299: String Quintet Op. 25 No. 5 in D major
G 300: String Quintet Op. 25 No. 6 in A minor

G 301: String Quintet Op. 27 No. 1 in A major (1779)
G 302: String Quintet Op. 27 No. 2 in G major

G 303: String Quintet Op. 27 No. 3 in E minor
G 304: String Quintet Op. 27 No. 4 in E-flat major
G 305: String Quintet Op. 27 No. 5 in G minor
G 306: String Quintet Op. 27 No. 6 in B minor
G 307: String Quintet Op. 28 No. 1 in F major (1779)
G 308: String Quintet Op. 28 No. 2 in A major
G 309: String Quintet Op. 28 No. 3 in E-flat major
G 310: String Quintet Op. 28 No. 4 in C major
G 311: String Quintet Op. 28 No. 5 in D minor
G 312: String Quintet Op. 28 No. 6 in B-flat major
G 313: String Quintet Op. 29 No. 1 in D major (1779)
G 314: String Quintet Op. 29 No. 2 in C minor
G 315: String Quintet Op. 29 No. 3 in F major
G 316: String Quintet Op. 29 No. 4 in A major
G 317: String Quintet Op. 29 No. 5 in E-flat major
G 318: String Quintet Op. 29 No. 6 in G minor
G 319: String Quintet Op. 30 No. 1 in B-flat major (1780)
G 320: String Quintet Op. 30 No. 2 in A minor
G 321: String Quintet Op. 30 No. 3 in C major
G 322: String Quintet Op. 30 No. 4 in E-flat major
G 323: String Quintet Op. 30 No. 5 in E minor
G 324: String Quintet Op. 30 No. 6 in C major ("Musica notturna delle strade di Madrid", featured in Master and Commander: The Far Side of the World)
G 325: String Quintet Op. 31 No. 1 in E-flat major (1780)
G 326: String Quintet Op. 31 No. 2 in G major
G 327: String Quintet Op. 31 No. 3 in B-flat major
G 328: String Quintet Op. 31 No. 4 in C minor
G 329: String Quintet Op. 31 No. 5 in A major
G 330: String Quintet Op. 31 No. 6 in F major
G 331: String Quintet Op. 36 No. 1 in E-flat major (1786)
G 332: String Quintet Op. 36 No. 2 in D major
G 333: String Quintet Op. 36 No. 3 in G major
G 334: String Quintet Op. 36 No. 4 in A minor
G 335: String Quintet Op. 36 No. 5 in G minor
G 336: String Quintet Op. 36 No. 6 in F major
G 337: String Quintet Op. 39 No. 1 in B-flat major (1787)
G 338: String Quintet Op. 39 No. 2 in F major
G 339: String Quintet Op. 39 No. 3 in D major
G 340: String Quintet Op. 40 No. 1 in A major (1788)
G 341: String Quintet Op. 40 No. 2 in D major
G 342: String Quintet Op. 40 No. 3 in D major
G 343: String Quintet Op. 40 No. 4 in C major
G 344: String Quintet Op. 40 No. 5 in E minor
G 345: String Quintet Op. 40 No. 6 in B-flat major
G 346: String Quintet Op. 41 No. 1 in E-flat major (1788)
G 347: String Quintet Op. 41 No. 2 in F major
G 348: String Quintet Op. 42 No. 1 in F minor (1789)
G 349: String Quintet Op. 42 No. 2 in C major
G 350: String Quintet Op. 42 No. 3 in B minor
G 351: String Quintet Op. 42 No. 4 in G minor
G 352: String Quintet Op. 43 No. 1 in E-flat major (1790)
G 353: String Quintet Op. 43 No. 2 in D major
G 354: String Quintet Op. 43 No. 3 in F major
G 355: String Quintet Op. 45 No. 1 in C minor (1792)
G 356: String Quintet Op. 45 No. 2 in A major
G 357: String Quintet Op. 45 No. 3 in B-flat major
G 358: String Quintet Op. 45 No. 4 in C major
G 359: String Quintet Op. 46 No. 1 in B-flat major (1793)
G 360: String Quintet Op. 46 No. 2 in D minor
G 361: String Quintet Op. 46 No. 3 in C major
G 362: String Quintet Op. 46 No. 4 in G minor
G 363: String Quintet Op. 46 No. 5 in F major
G 364: String Quintet Op. 46 No. 6 in E-flat major
G 365: String Quintet Op. 49 No. 1 in D major (1794)
G 366: String Quintet Op. 49 No. 2 in B-flat major
G 367: String Quintet Op. 49 No. 3 in E-flat major
G 368: String Quintet Op. 49 No. 4 in D minor
G 369: String Quintet Op. 49 No. 5 in E-flat major
G 370: String Quintet Op. 50 No. 1 in A major (1795)
G 371: String Quintet Op. 50 No. 2 in E-flat major
G 372: String Quintet Op. 50 No. 3 in B-flat major
G 373: String Quintet Op. 50 No. 4 in E major
G 374: String Quintet Op. 50 No. 5 in C major
G 375: String Quintet Op. 50 No. 6 in B-flat major
G 376: String Quintet Op. 51 No. 1 in E-flat major (1795)
G 377: String Quintet Op. 51 No. 2 in C minor
G 378: String Quintet in C major
G 379: String Quintet in E minor (from G 407)
G 380: String Quintet in F major (from G 408)
G 381: String Quintet in E-flat major (from G 410)
G 382: String Quintet in A minor (from G 412)
G 383: String Quintet in D major (from G 411)
G 384: String Quintet in C major (from G 409)
G 385: String Quintet in D minor (from G 416)
G 386: String Quintet in E minor (from G 417)
G 387: String Quintet in B-flat major (from G 414)
G 388: String Quintet in A major (from G 413)
G 389: String Quintet in E minor (from G 415)
G 390: String Quintet in C major (from G 418)
G 391: String Quintet Op. 60 No. 1 in C major (1801)
G 392: String Quintet Op. 60 No. 2 in B-flat major
G 393: String Quintet Op. 60 No. 3 in A major
G 394: String Quintet Op. 60 No. 4 in E-flat major (lost)
G 395: String Quintet Op. 60 No. 5 in G major
G 396: String Quintet Op. 60 No. 6 in E major
G 397: String Quintet Op. 62 No. 1 in C major (1802)
G 398: String Quintet Op. 62 No. 2 in E-flat major
G 399: String Quintet Op. 62 No. 3 in F major

G 400: String Quintet Op. 62 No. 4 in B-flat major
G 401: String Quintet Op. 62 No. 5 in D major
G 402: String Quintet Op. 62 No. 6 in E major
G 403: 6 String Quintets from Op. 10, G 265–270
G 404: 6 String Quintets from Op. 11, G 271–276
G 405: 6 String Quintets from Op. 18, G 283–288
G 406: String Quintet in E-flat major (lost)

Piano Quintets
G 407: Piano Quintet Op. 56 No. 1 in E minor (1797)
G 408: Piano Quintet Op. 56 No. 2 in F major
G 409: Piano Quintet Op. 56 No. 3 in C major
G 410: Piano Quintet Op. 56 No. 4 in E-flat major
G 411: Piano Quintet Op. 56 No. 5 in D major
G 412: Piano Quintet Op. 56 No. 6 in A minor
G 413: Piano Quintet Op. 57 No. 1 in A major (1799)
G 414: Piano Quintet Op. 57 No. 2 in B-flat major
G 415: Piano Quintet Op. 57 No. 3 in E minor
G 416: Piano Quintet Op. 57 No. 4 in D minor
G 417: Piano Quintet Op. 57 No. 5 in E major
G 418: Piano Quintet Op. 57 No. 6 in C major

Flute Quintets
G 419: Flute Quintet Op. 17 No. 1 in D major (1773)
G 420: Flute Quintet Op. 17 No. 2 in C major
G 421: Flute Quintet Op. 17 No. 3 in D minor
G 422: Flute Quintet Op. 17 No. 4 in B-flat major
G 423: Flute Quintet Op. 17 No. 5 in G major
G 424: Flute Quintet Op. 17 No. 6 in E-flat major
G 425: Flute Quintet Op. 19 No. 1 in E-flat major (1774)
G 426: Flute Quintet Op. 19 No. 2 in G minor
G 427: Flute Quintet Op. 19 No. 3 in C major
G 428: Flute Quintet Op. 19 No. 4 in D major
G 429: Flute Quintet Op. 19 No. 5 in B-flat major
G 430: Flute Quintet Op. 19 No. 6 in D major
G 431: Flute Quintet Op. 55 No. 1 in G major (1797)
G 432: Flute Quintet Op. 55 No. 2 in F major
G 433: Flute Quintet Op. 55 No. 3 in D major
G 434: Flute Quintet Op. 55 No. 4 in A major
G 435: Flute Quintet Op. 55 No. 5 in E-flat major
G 436: Flute Quintet Op. 55 No. 6 in D minor
G 437: Flute Quintet with cello concertante No. 1 in F major
G 438: Flute Quintet with cello concertante No. 2 in G major
G 439: Flute Quintet with cello concertante No. 3 in C major
G 440: Flute Quintet with cello concertante No. 4 in D major
G 441: Flute Quintet with cello concertante No. 5 in G major
G 442: Flute Quintet with cello concertante No. 6 in B-flat major
G 443: Quintet for flute, oboe & strings in C major
G 444: Quintet for flute, oboe & strings in B-flat major

Guitar Quintets
The movements of the guitar quintets are wholly transcribed by the composer from earlier quintets (usually string or piano quintets).

G 445: Guitar Quintet No. 1 in D minor
G 446: Guitar Quintet No. 2 in E major
G 447: Guitar Quintet No. 3 in B-flat major
G 448: Guitar Quintet No. 4 in D major ("Fandango")
G 449: Guitar Quintet No. 5 in D major
G 450: Guitar Quintet No. 6 in G major
G 451: Guitar Quintet No. 7 in E minor
G 452: Guitar Quintet No. 8 in F major (lost)
G 453: Guitar Quintet No. 9 in C major ("La Ritirata di Madrid")

Sextets
G 454: String Sextet Op. 23 No. 1 in E-flat major (1776)
G 455: String Sextet Op. 23 No. 2 in B-flat major
G 456: String Sextet Op. 23 No. 3 in E major
G 457: String Sextet Op. 23 No. 4 in F minor
G 458: String Sextet Op. 23 No. 5 in D major
G 459: String Sextet Op. 23 No. 6 in F major
G 460: String Sextet in D major [Not Boccherini. It is a work of Gaetano Brunetti L 267]
G 461: Divertimento Op. 16 No. 1 in A major (1773)
G 462: Divertimento Op. 16 No. 2 in F major
G 463: Divertimento Op. 16 No. 3 in A major
G 464: Divertimento Op. 16 No. 4 in E-flat major
G 465: Divertimento Op. 16 No. 5 in A major
G 466: Divertimento Op. 16 No. 6 in C major

Octets
G 467: Notturno Op. 38 No. 1 in E-flat major (1787)
G 468: Notturno Op. 38 No. 2 in E-flat major (lost)
G 469: Notturno Op. 38 No. 3 in E-flat major (lost)
G 470: Notturno Op. 38 No. 4 in G major
G 471: Notturno Op. 38 No. 5 in E-flat major
G 472: Notturno Op. 38 No. 6 in B-flat major
G 473: Notturno Op. 42 in E-flat major (1789, lost)

Cello Concertos
G 474: Cello Concerto No. 1 in E-flat major
G 475: Cello Concerto No. 2 in A major
G 476: Cello Concerto No. 3 in D major
G 477: Cello Concerto No. 4 in C major
G 478: Cello Concerto No. 5 in D major
G 479: Cello Concerto No. 6 in D major
G 480: Cello Concerto No. 7 in G major
G 481: Cello Concerto No. 8 in C major
G 482: Cello Concerto No. 9 in B-flat major
G 483: Cello Concerto No. 10 in D major
G 484: Cello Concertino in D major
G 573: Cello Concerto No. 11 in C major
G deest: Cello Concerto No. 12 in E-flat major

Other Concertos
G 485: Violin Concerto in G major
G 486: Violin Concerto in D major
G 487: Piano Concerto in E-flat major
G 488: Piano Concerto in C major (sketch)
G 489: Flute Concerto in D major (spurious), it is a work of František Xaver Pokorný 
G 574: Violin Concerto in F major
G 575: Flute Concerto in D major

Symphonies
G 490: Overture in D major (c. 1765, second movement related to G478)
G 491: Sinfonia concertante Op. 7 in C major (1769)
G 492: 6 Divertimenti (6 Sextets) Op. 16, G 461–466 (1773)
G 493: Symphony Op. 21 No. 1 in B-flat major (1775)
G 494: Symphony Op. 21 No. 2 in E-flat major
G 495: Symphony Op. 21 No. 3 in C major
G 496: Symphony Op. 21 No. 4 in D major
G 497: Symphony Op. 21 No. 5 in B-flat major
G 498: Symphony Op. 21 No. 6 in A major
G 499: Sinfonia concertante in G major (= G470)
G 500: Symphony in D major (1767)
G 501: Serenade in D major
G 502: 2 Minuets
G 503: Symphony Op. 12 No. 1 in D major (1771)
G 504: Symphony Op. 12 No. 2 in E-flat major
G 505: Symphony Op. 12 No. 3 in C major
G 506: Symphony Op. 12 No. 4 in D minor ("La Casa del Diavolo")
G 507: Symphony Op. 12 No. 5 in B-flat major
G 508: Symphony Op. 12 No. 6 in A major
G 509: Symphony Op. 35 No. 1 in D major (1782)
G 510: Symphony Op. 35 No. 2 in E-flat major
G 511: Symphony Op. 35 No. 3 in A major
G 512: Symphony Op. 35 No. 4 in F major
G 513: Symphony Op. 35 No. 5 in E-flat major
G 514: Symphony Op. 35 No. 6 in B-flat major
G 515: Symphony Op. 37 No. 1 in C major (1786)
G 516: Symphony Op. 37 No. 2 in D major (1786, lost)
G 517: Symphony Op. 37 No. 3 in D minor (1787)
G 518: Symphony Op. 37 No. 4 in A major (1787)
G 519: Symphony Op. 41 in C minor (1788)
G 520: Symphony Op. 42 in D major (1789)
G 521: Symphony Op. 43 in D major (1790)
G 522: Symphony Op. 45 in D major (1792)
G 523: Symphony in C major
G 576: Symphony in G major

Theatrical Works
G 524: Cefalo e Procri (lost)
G 525: Un gioco di minuetto ballabili Op. 41
G 526: Ballet espagnol
G 527: Interlude to Picini's opera: La buona figliola
G 540: Clementina, zarzuela
G 541: Scene from 'Ines de Castro'
G 542: Aria for the opera "L'Almeria" (lost)

Liturgical Works
G 528: Missa solemnis Op. 59 (lost)
G 529: Kyrie in B-flat major
G 530: Gloria in F major
G 531: Credo in C major
G 532a: Stabat Mater in A-flat major
G 532b: Stabat Mater Op. 61 in F major
G 533: Dixit Dominus in G major
G 534: Domine ad adjuvandum in G major
G 535: Christmas Cantata Op. 63 (lost)
G 536: Cantata for the feast of Saint Louis (fragment)
G 539: Villancicos al nacimiento de nuestro Senor Jesu Christo
G deest: Laudate pueri

Oratorios
G 537: Gioas, re di Giuda (1767)
G 538: Giuseppe riconosciuto (1767)

Cantata
G 543: La Confederazione dei Sabini con Roma

Concert Arias
G 544: Aria accademica No. 1 in E-flat major
G 545: Aria accademica No. 2 in B-flat major
G 546: Aria accademica No. 3 in G major
G 547: Aria accademica No. 4 in A major
G 548: Aria accademica No. 5 in D minor
G 549: Aria accademica No. 6 in D major
G 550: Aria accademica No. 7 in E-flat major
G 551: Aria accademica No. 8 in G major
G 552: Aria accademica No. 9 in C major
G 553: Aria accademica No. 10 in F major
G 554: Aria accademica No. 11 in A major
G 555: Aria accademica No. 12 in B-flat major
G 556: Aria accademica No. 13 in E major
G 557: Aria accademica No. 14 in B-flat major
G 558: Aria accademica No. 15 in E-flat major
G 559: Duetto accademico No. 1 in E-flat major
G 560: Duetto accademico No. 2 in F major
G 561: Duetto accademico No. 3 in E-flat major

References

Sources 
 Grove Music Online (subscription required)
 On-line catalog of works by Boccherini 
 Gérard, Yves: Thematic, Bibliographical and Critical Catalogue of the Works of Luigi Boccherini (London, Oxford University Press, 1969, 716p.) 
 Boccherini's autograph catalogue, from Piquot (1851) and Boccherini y Calonje (1879)

 
Boccherini
Boccherini